Rickett's big-footed bat (Myotis pilosus) is a species of vesper bat. It can be found in southern and eastern China, Vietnam, and Laos. This species has often been called Myotis ricketti, but the older M. pilosus has priority. The erroneous reporting of the type locality as being in Uruguay by Wilhelm Peters led to the dual naming.

Rickett's big-footed bat is a widely distributed habitat specialist that is strictly dependent on water since its diet consists in large proportion of fish. Near Beijing, its diet was 60% pale chub (Zacco platypus), and 13% water beetles. It is threatened by water pollution.

Rickett's big-footed bat was featured in the BBC video series Wild China.

References

Mammals of China. Smith, Xie, eds. 2013 Princeton

Mouse-eared bats
Mammals of China
Mammals of Hong Kong
Mammals of Laos
Mammals of Vietnam
Taxa named by Wilhelm Peters
Mammals described in 1869
Taxonomy articles created by Polbot